Arthur Chichester, 2nd Earl of Donegall (died 26 October 1678) was an Anglo-Irish politician.

Chichester was the son of Lieutenant Colonel John Chichester (died 1647), of Dungannon, County Tyrone, the latter being the younger brother of Arthur Chichester, 1st Earl of Donegall, and younger son of Edward Chichester, 1st Viscount Chichester. His mother was Mary Jones (died 1673), daughter of Roger Jones, 1st Viscount Ranelagh. After his father's death, she remarried Colonel Christopher Copley of Wadworth. He was knighted at Whitehall in 1660, and served in the Irish House of Commons as Member of Parliament for Dungannon (1661–1666). He was also made an Irish Privy Counsellor in 1672.

Chichester married Jane Ichyngham, daughter of John Ichyngham of Dunbrody, County Wexford, a descendant of Sir Edward Echyngham (died 1527) of Barsham, Suffolk.

In 1675 Chichester succeeded his uncle as second Earl of Donegall, inheriting the title under the special remainder granted with it to the male heirs of his grandfather, Edward Chichester, 1st Viscount Chichester. He was Custos Rotulorum for County Antrim and Governor of Carrickfergus for twelve years before dying in Ireland in 1678. His wife survived him and remarried.

References

Donegall, Arthur Chichester, 2nd Earl of
Donegall, Arthur Chichester, 2nd Earl of
Arthur
Year of birth unknown
Chichester, Arthur
Chichester, Arthur
2